Stay Hungry is a 1976 American comedy-drama film by director Bob Rafelson from a screenplay by Charles Gaines (adapted from his 1972 novel of the same name).

The story centers on a young scion from Birmingham, Alabama, played by Jeff Bridges, who gets involved in a shady real-estate deal. In order to close the deal, he needs to buy a gym building to complete a multi-parcel lot. He becomes romantically interested in the gym's receptionist (Sally Field) and drawn to the carefree lifestyle of the Austrian bodybuilder Joe Santo (Arnold Schwarzenegger), who is training there for the Mr. Universe competition.

Schwarzenegger won a Golden Globe for Best Acting Debut in a Motion Picture, but it was not his true debut role; he had played Hercules (as Arnold Strong) in the 1970 film Hercules in New York, a gangster's henchman in Robert Altman's 1973 film The Long Goodbye, and a masseur in the 1974 television movie Happy Anniversary and Goodbye.

Plot
Craig Blake is a young Southern man born of a wealthy family, but left lonely and idle after his parents died in a plane crash. He is content to spend his time fishing, hunting and puttering around his large family mansion in Birmingham, Alabama, inhabited only by himself and a butler. Blake is employed at a shady investment firm run by a slick con artist named Jabo where Blake does very little actual work. He is asked to handle the purchase of a small gym that the firm is buying to clear space for an office high-rise.

Blake represents himself as a businessman looking to buy the gym and meets its owner Thor Erikson and employees Franklin and Newton. He is strangely fascinated with the world he discovers there. Blake's usual social life is centered around his upscale country club and its crowd, including his friends Lester and Halsey, and spends his time there playing tennis, shooting poker dice and flirting with women, one of whom asks Blake to find a musical guest for an upcoming party.

As Blake moves forward with the business deal, he is smitten with the receptionist, Mary Tate Farnsworth, and befriends  bodybuilder Joe Santo, who aspires to win the Mr. Universe title. He finds he ultimately cannot sell out his newfound friends at the gym for the sake of his job, so he constantly evades questions about the progress of the gym deal from friend and coworker Hal Foss.

Mary Tate and Craig begin a passionate relationship, but trouble erupts when he tries to integrate her into his country-club scene. At a party at the club, which features Santo performing with a country group, Craig's friends mock Santo as a "freak" and an outcast. A fight nearly breaks out between Halsey and Blake but is broken up. Halsey and his friend Packman formulate a plan to embarrass Santo. When Santo takes the stage, Halsey and Packman drunkenly heckle him and the band. Santo tries to ignore it but soon stops playing his violin and leaves the party. Craig tries to convince Mary Tate to see him for who he really is, and not for his snobbish friends and surroundings.

When Jabo realizes that Blake will not purchase the building, he plies Thor and his assistant Newton with drugs, booze and hookers. The Mr. Universe competition arrives and Santo is hoping to beat his rival Dougie Stewart. While Thor is drunk and distracted with the prostitutes, Newton secretly stashes the prize money inside his bag and flees.

Blake visits the gym and engages in a fight with the drunken and drugged Thor. He finds Mary Tate, who earlier had been assaulted by Thor in an amyl nitrite-fueled rage.

When the Mr. Universe contestants discover that the prize money has been stolen, they run after Santo, who is running to meet Mary Tate. The chase of bodybuilders pours out into the streets of Birmingham and attracts an amazed crowd of onlookers. The bodybuilders engage in an impromptu posing routine for the crowd.

Craig sarcastically derides his former bosses at the real-estate firm and goes into the gym business with Santo. Craig mocks Jabo with an exaggerated bodybuilding pose and moves out of his family's mansion, leaving his old family memorabilia to his butler.

Cast

 Jeff Bridges as Craig Blake
 Sally Field as Mary Tate Farnsworth
 Arnold Schwarzenegger as Joe Santo
 R. G. Armstrong as Thor Erickson
 Robert Englund as Franklin
 Helena Kallianiotes as Anita
 Roger E. Mosley as Newton
 Woodrow Parfrey as Uncle Albert
 Scatman Crothers as William
 Kathleen Miller as Dorothy Stephens
 Fannie Flagg as Amy
 Joanna Cassidy as Zoe
 Richard Gilliland as Hal
 Mayf Nutter as Richard Packman
 Ed Begley Jr. as Lester
 John David Carson as Halsey
 Joe Spinell as Jabo
 Clifford A. Pellow as Walter Jr. (credited as Cliff Pellow)
 Dennis Fimple as Bubba
 Garry Goodrow as Moe Zwick
 Bart Carpinelli as Laverne
 Bob Westmoreland as Fred Kroop
 Brandy Wilde as Flower
 Laura Hippe as Mae Ruth
 John Gilgreen as Security Officer
 Murray Johnson as Heavy #1
 Dennis Burkley as Heavy #2
 Autry Pinson as Heavy #3
 Martin Hames as The Bartender
 Byron Berline as Fiddler With Mustache
 Susan Bridges as Blonde Photographer at Contest
 Roger Callard as Bodybuilder In Blue Shorts
 Franco Columbu as Franco Orsini
 Ed Corney as Bodybuilder
 Roland LeGrand Godfrey as Water Skier Single Ski Dock Start
 Mary Leona Perry Kirtley as Water Skier Double Ski Dock Start and Skiing Next to A Tug Boat and Barge
 Janelle Kirtley as Water Ski Trainer For Sally Field
William Kent Jones as Contestant Judge
 Bob Rafelson as Man On Sidewalk With Painting
 Robbie Robinson as Bodybuilder At Contest
 Ken Waller as Doug Stewart
 Jolene Wolff as Mrs. Clyde

Production
Stay Hungry marked the final film for production designer Toby Carr Rafelson, Rafelson's wife and film-production partner. After learning that her husband pursued women during production, including Sally Field, she filed for divorce and never worked for Rafelson again.

Roger Callard, a top bodybuilder of the era, said of his experience making the film: "The director was screaming over his megaphone, 'Please do not touch the bodybuilders!'  People were rushing us, even scratching us!"

Reception

Critical response
For The New York Times, critic Vincent Canby wrote that the film "isn't all bad. It just seems that way when it pretends to be more eccentric than it is and to have more on its mind than it actually does." However, Canby praised the film's depiction of the New South and the performances by Bridges, Field and Schwarzenegger.

Los Angeles Times reviewer Charles Champlin wrote: "It is several movies not quite rolled into one, good performances and good sequences tossed together in the lap of chance, leading to a denouement that would be even cheerier if what went before had engaged belief or concern."

On Rotten Tomatoes, the film has an approval rating of 67% based on reviews from 15 critics, with an average rating of 6.6/10. On Metacritic, it has a score of 60% based on reviews from 7 critics, indicating "mixed or average" reviews.

References

External links
 

Films directed by Bob Rafelson
Films based on American novels
1976 films
1970s romantic comedy-drama films
American romantic comedy-drama films
1970s English-language films
Culture of Birmingham, Alabama
Bodybuilding films
Films set in Alabama
Films set in country houses
Films with screenplays by Bob Rafelson
United Artists films
1976 comedy films
1976 drama films
Films scored by Bruce Langhorne
Films produced by Bob Rafelson
Films with screenplays by Charles Gaines
Films scored by Byron Berline
1970s American films